Frazer Corners is an unincorporated community in Shawano County, Wisconsin, United States. Frazer Corners is partly located in the towns of Angelica, Hartland, Lessor, and Maple Grove. A post office was established in Frazer Corners in December 1881 with Peter E. Blitchfeldt as the first postmaster.

References

Unincorporated communities in Shawano County, Wisconsin
Unincorporated communities in Wisconsin